Toia is an Italian origin surname. People with the surname include:

 Donny Toia (born 1992), American football player
 Geremia Toia (born 1966), Italian equestrian
 Hōne Riiwi Tōia (1858–1933), Maori tribal and religious leader
 Jim Toia, American artist and art scholar
 Luke Toia (born 1977), Australian rules footballer
 Mase Toia Alama (1951—2022), Samoan doctor and civil servant
 Patrizia Toia (born 1950), Italian politician 

Italian-language surnames